Pritchardia affinis, the Hawai'i pritchardia,  is a species of palm tree that is endemic to the Hawaiian Islands. Wild populations currently exist on the leeward side of the Island of Hawaii. It was most likely cultivated by Native Hawaiians, so its exact native range is uncertain. It is threatened by rats and pigs, which damage the trees and eat the seeds before they can grow. It is a federally listed endangered species of the United States. Its fruit was reportedly the preferred food of the now-extinct ula-ai-hawane—a niche that has been seemingly filled by the introduced lavender waxbill.

References

External links
 
 

affinis
Endemic flora of Hawaii
Trees of Hawaii
Biota of Hawaii (island)
Plants described in 1921
Taxa named by Odoardo Beccari
Taxonomy articles created by Polbot